Dhawa may refer to:

Dhawa people, an ethnic group of Australia
Dhawa language, an Australian language
Dhawa Zone, a zone of Ethiopia
Dhawa, Rajasthan, a town in India
Dhawa, Nepal, a village development committee in Nepal
Anogeissus latifolia, known in Hindi as dhawa, a species of tree

See also
Dhaoa, a village in Bangladesh